Korra is a village in the Baruraj Motipur tehsil, Muzaffarpur district, Bihar state, India.

References

Villages in Muzaffarpur district